Cionobrissus revinctus is a species of sea urchins of the Family Brissidae. Their armour is covered with spines. Cionobrissus revinctus was first scientifically described in 1879 by Alexander Emanuel Agassiz.

See also 

 Cidaris nuda
 Cidaris rugosa
 Clypeaster aloysioi

References 

Spatangoida
Animals described in 1879